The 2019 FINA Men's Water Polo World League was the 18th edition of the annual men's international water polo tournament. It was played between October 2018 and June 2019 and opened to all men's water polo national teams. After participating in a preliminary round, eight teams qualified to play in a final tournament, called the Super Final from 18–23 June 2019.

In the world league, there are specific rules that do not allow matches to end in a draw.  If teams are level at the end of the 4th quarter of any world league match, the match will be decided by a penalty shootout. Teams earn points in the standings in group matches as follows:

 Match won in normal time – 3 points
 Match won in shootout – 2 points
 Match lost in shootout – 1 point
 Match lost in normal time – 0 points

Preliminary rounds

European Qualification  
 October 23, 2018 – March 12, 2019

Group A

Group B

Group C

Group D

Europa Cup Final  
 April 5–7, 2019, Zagreb, Croatia

Bracket 

5th–8th place bracket

Final ranking 

Source:

Intercontinental Cup  
 March 26–31, 2019, Perth, Australia

Group A

Group B

Bracket 

5th–8th place bracket

Final ranking 

Source:

Super Final  
 June 18–23, 2019, Belgrade, Serbia

Venue

Qualified teams

Group A 

All times are UTC+2.

Group B 

All times are UTC+2.

Bracket 

5th–8th place bracket

All times are UTC+2.

Quarterfinals

5th–8th place semifinals

Semifinals

7th place game

5th place game

3rd place game

Final

Final ranking

Source:

Team Roster
Gojko Pijetlović, Dušan Mandić, Ognjen Stojanović, Sava Ranđelović, Miloš Ćuk, Duško Pijetlović, Nemanja Vico, Milan Aleksić, Nikola Jakšić, Filip Filipović , Andrija Prlainović, Stefan Mitrović, Branislav Mitrović, Radomir Drašović, Strahinja Rašović. Head coach: Dejan Savić.

Awards

References

External links 
 Official website
 FINA Water Polo World League Super Final 

World League, men
FINA Water Polo World League
International water polo competitions hosted by Serbia
International sports competitions in Belgrade
2019 in Serbian sport